The Nicca Camera Co. Ltd. started as the optical workshop Kōgaku Seiki Co. in 1940, founded by former employees of Canon.  Its first camera, the Nippon, a close copy of the Leica rangefinder camera, was produced in 1942. 

In 1948, the company changed its name to the Nippon Camera Works, and a year later, to the Nicca Camera Works. It continued to build Leica-type rangefinder cameras, adding such features as flash synchronization, lever wind, a hinged film back, and projected viewfinder framing. Nicca also made cameras for Sears under the Tower name. 

In 1958, the company was acquired by Yashica, which manufactured and re-labeled the Nicca-33 and III-L as the Yashica YE and YF respectively.

External links 
 history

Photography companies of Japan